Castlepoint is a small beachside settlement on the Wairarapa coast of the Wellington Region of New Zealand.  It is home to a lighthouse which stands near the top of the northern end of a reef. The reef is about one kilometre long. At the southern end of the reef, there is an island known locally as "seagull island", due to its large population of seagulls. The southern side of Castle Rock is known as Christmas Bay. Castlepoint is approximately one hour's drive from Masterton.

Castlepoint was so named in 1770 by Captain Cook who was struck by the similarities of Castle Rock to the battlements of a castle.  The Maori name for the area is Rangiwhakaoma, which translates as 'where the sky runs'.
Smaller cetaceans such as dolphins frequent around Castlepoint while larger whales such as southern right whales and humpback whales may be visible from the shores during their migration seasons.
A book chronicling the history of Castlepoint, including Castlepoint Station, Castle Point Lighthouse and the local fishing industry was published in October 2010 by Hedleys Books of Masterton.

Castle Rock is a landmark in Castlepoint and is 162m high. It includes a walk through woods and over bridges and is approximately 45 minutes long.
 
Mataikona Sand Dunes are an area of large sand dunes approximately 30 minutes north of Castlepoint towards the Matakona River mouth.

Demographics

There were 24 households. There were 33 males and 21 females, giving a sex ratio of 1.57 males per female. The median age was 50.3 years (compared with 37.4 years nationally), with 6 people (10.5%) aged under 15 years, 9 (15.8%) aged 15 to 29, 27 (47.4%) aged 30 to 64, and 12 (21.1%) aged 65 or older.

Ethnicities were 94.7% European/Pākehā, and 5.3% Māori.

Although some people objected to giving their religion, 68.4% had no religion, and 21.1% were Christian.

Of those at least 15 years old, 9 (17.6%) people had a bachelor or higher degree, and 9 (17.6%) people had no formal qualifications. The median income was $30,000, compared with $31,800 nationally. The employment status of those at least 15 was that 27 (52.9%) people were employed full-time, and 6 (11.8%) were part-time.

Castlepoint is part of the Whareama statistical area.

Marae

The local Whakataki marae is affiliated with the Ngāti Kahungunu hapū of Te Hika a Pāpāuma ki Wairarapa. Its wharenui burned down 1960.

Annual horse races 

Remote from other settlements Castlepoint's beach has been home since 1872 to an historic annual horse race meeting when "local station hands rode on farm hacks competing for bottles of rum and any stray coins".

Lighthouse 

The Castle Point Lighthouse is a lighthouse near the village of Castlepoint in the Wellington Region of the North Island of New Zealand. It is owned and operated by Maritime New Zealand.
In the early days of the 20th century Castle Point was one of the few lighthouses with easy access to a school. The Creamer family came there in 1918 or 1919 and the eldest son Eric had to complete five years of education in three years, so that he could go on to secondary school, there having been little education in previous locations where the family had been stationed.
This aspect of the Keeper's lives seems to have been overlooked by the Marine Department.
The light was built in 1913 and was originally fueled by oil. In 1954 the oil lamp was replaced with an electric one powered by a local diesel generator. This was subsequently replaced by a connection to the mains grid in 1961. The lighthouse, is popular with holiday makers and the lighthouse itself is sometimes referred to as "The Holiday Light".

Completed on 12 January 1913, it was one of the last manned lights built in New Zealand, but has been fully automated since 1988 and is now managed from a central control room in Wellington.
 It is a popular tourist attraction for holidaymakers to the area, although it is not open to the public.

The lighthouse is built out of steel sheets riveted together.  This is an unusual method of construction for a lighthouse and the only one so built in New Zealand.

At sea, the light can be seen 22 miles away, and was used by sailors coming from South America to establish a point of reference when making for Wellington Harbour.

A camera set up at the top of an outcrop looking down on the lighthouse gives people a chance to see it on live feed castlepointlighthouse.com.

In December 2017 the lighthouse was controversially installed with multi-colour LED up-lights which would light the exterior of the lighthouse all year round at a cost of $35,000. Many Wairarapa region residents feel the lights are 'gaudy' and a source of unnecessary light pollution.

Gallery

References 

Populated places in the Wellington Region
Masterton District
Surfing locations in New Zealand